Workwear is clothing worn for work, especially work that involves manual labour. Often those employed within trade industries elect to be outfitted in workwear because it is built to provide durability and safety.

The workwear clothing industry is growing and consumers have numerous retailers to choose from. Chains that have made a commitment to the $1 billion and rising workwear business report steady 6 percent to 8 percent annual gains in men's workwear.

In the United Kingdom, if workwear is provided to an employee without a logo, it may be subject to income tax being levied on the employee for a "payment in kind." However, if company clothing is provided with logos on then the employee may be entitled to a tax rebate to help pay for the upkeep.

History 

In Britain from the mid 19th century until the 1970s, dustmen, coalmen, and the manual laborers known as navvies wore flat caps, corduroy pants, heavy boots, and donkey jackets, often with a brightly colored cotton neckerchief to soak up the sweat. Later versions of the donkey jacket came with leather shoulder patches to prevent wear when shouldering a spade or pick. Mill workers in Yorkshire and Lancashire wore a variant of this basic outfit with English clogs. The cuffs of the pants were frequently secured with string, and grandad shirts were worn without a collar to decrease the likelihood of being caught in the steam powered machinery.

Maritime workwear 

Since the late 18th century, merchant seamen and dockworkers have worn denim flared trousers, striped undershirts, knitted roll neck jumpers, and short blue peacoats. This basic outfit, paired with a thick leather belt, flat cap and clogs, was also a mark of identification for turn of the century criminal gangs such as the Scuttlers.
On the more luxurious cruise ships and ocean liners, deckhands wore neatly pressed dress blues similar to those of the Royal Navy and USN, while waiters and cabin stewards wore white uniforms with a band collar, gilded brass buttons, and a gold stripe on the trouser leg. In wet weather, sailors wore oilskins and Souwesters, but contemporary fishermen generally wear a two piece yellow or orange waterproof jacket and trousers. Modern updates to the traditional look include polar fleeces, hoodies, baseball caps, and knit caps. Straw hats, sailor caps and tarred waterproof hats are no longer in widespread civilian use, but wool or denim versions of the Greek fisherman's cap remain common.

Railroad use 
In the Old West era, Union Pacific train engineers and railroad workers wore distinctive overalls, caps and work jackets made from hickory stripe before boiler suits were invented in the early 20th century. Railway conductors, porters and station masters wore more formal blue uniforms based on the three piece lounge suit, with brass buttons and a military surplus kepi from the Civil War era. In modern times, the striped engineer cap remains part of the uniform of American train drivers.

Modern era

Logging industry 

Since the days of the Old West, American and Canadian lumberjacks have worn buffalo plaid Pendleton jackets, wool tuques, trapper hats, tall waterproof boots with a reinforced toecap, and chaps as protection from the chainsaw. Olive drab versions of the padded wool jacket were issued to US Army jeep crews during the war, and plaid Pendletons became popular casual wear in America during the 1950s.

Use by truckers 

From the 1930s onwards, truckers and mechanics wore a distinctive outfit comprising mechanic's cap, white T-shirt, bandana, boiler suit, checked shirt, leather coat, Pendleton jacket, double denim jacket, and blue jeans. The skipper cap in particular signified the truckers' link with the big seaports, from which imported goods were transported all over the country. This look served as the inspiration for the ton-up boy, raggare, and greaser subculture during the 1950s and 1960s. By the early 1980s, the peaked caps had been replaced with foam and mesh baseball caps known as trucker hats or gimme caps, which were originally given to truck drivers by manufacturers such as John Deere, Mountain Dew or Budweiser to advertise their products.

1990s to ongoing 
In the present day, industrial and service industry workwear typically comprises T-shirts or polo shirts that are cheap to replace, black or navy polyester and cotton blend pants, steel capped boots, and for cashiers at large department stores like Wal-Mart or Aldi, a colored waistcoat or tabard bearing the company logo. Zip up Polar fleeces, originally invented during the 1970s for use by meat packing plant workers in the large refrigerated units, are also commonly worn by factory workers, barrow boys and stock handlers in colder climates.

Inspiration in Fashion 

During the 1980s, workwear such as the donkey jacket and Doc Martens safety boots were popular street attire for British skinheads, suedeheads, hardcore punks and football hooligans. More recently, Celtic punk groups such as Dropkick Murphys have adopted aspects of the look such as the flat cap to assert their working class Irish identity.

In the 21st century, the style has also made a huge impact on the fashion industry, including segments such as streetwear. Workwear has not just become a style of clothes that has been adopted by the hipster subculture, but a culture and way of life in this particular community. Pompadour hair cuts, tattoos, denim jackets, military trench coats, lumberjack flannels, chambray shirts, raw denim, and work boots take part into this workwear style.

See also 

Personal protective equipment
Dress code
Western dress codes
 Casual wear
 Business casual
 Smart casual
 Casual Friday
 Sportswear

References